Rongme Ngatra is the highest peak of the Chola Mountains in the Kham region of western Sichuan, China. The peak's name in Mandarin Chinese is Que Er Shan also the same name as the entire range, which has led to some translations of the mountain peak to Chola Mountain. At , the mountain is the highest peak in the Chola Mountains, as well as the second highest in the greater Shaluli Mountains after Ge'nyen. The mountain peak is flanked by glaciers to the north and east. Rongme Ngatra can be accessed from the town of Manigango in Dege County, Garze Prefecture.

References

External links
 http://www.summitpost.org/chola-shan/153384

Mountains of Sichuan